John McGraw (born Roy Elmer Hoar or Heir, December 8, 1890 – April 27, 1967) was a Federal League pitcher. McGraw played for the Brooklyn Tip-Tops in the 1914 season. He played just 1 game in his career, pitching in 2 innings, and striking out 2.

McGraw was born in Intercourse, Pennsylvania, and died in Torrance, California.

He changed his name to John McGraw, after the more famous player/manager John McGraw, in order to maintain his amateur status. McGraw was an alumnus of Carnegie Mellon University.

External links

Brooklyn Tip-Tops players
1890 births
1967 deaths
Baseball players from Pennsylvania
Carnegie Mellon Tartans baseball players